Jovan Cvijić (1865 – 16 January 1927) was a Serbian geographer and ethnologist, president of the Serbian Royal Academy of Sciences and rector of the University of Belgrade. Cvijić is considered the founder of geography in Serbia. He began his scientific career as a geographer and geologist, and continued his activity as a human geographer and sociologist.

Early life and family 

Cvijić was born in Loznica, in the westernmost part of the Principality of Serbia. His family was part of the Spasojević branch of the Piva tribe (Pivljani) in Old Herzegovina (currently Montenegro). Cvijić's father, Todor, was a merchant; his grandfather, Živko, was head of Loznica and a supporter of the House of Obrenović in Mačva. Živko fought in the 1844 Katana Uprising against the Defenders of the Constitution, and died after torture.

Cvijić's great-grandfather, Cvijo Spasojević, patriarch of the Cvijić family, was a hajduk leader in Old Herzegovina who fought in the First Serbian Uprising against the Ottoman Empire. After its failure in 1813, he moved to Loznica, built a house and opened a store.

His father, Todor (d. 1900), was a trader before accepting a clerkship in the municipality. Cvijić's mother, Marija, was from a family in the village of Koremita in the Jadar region (near Tronoša and Tršić, the birthplace of Vuk Stefanović Karadžić). Todor and Marija had two sons, Živko and Jovan, and three daughters. Cvijić often said that in his childhood his spiritual education was primarily influenced by his mother and her family; he said less about his father and his father's family. However, in his works on ethnic psychology, Cvijić praised the Dinaric race of his father.

Education 

After completing elementary school, Cvijić attended grammar school in Loznica where he took an interest in literature and learned French and German.

He continued his education in Šabac before embarking to the First Belgrade Gymnasium to study medicine, graduating in 1884.

After graduation, he wanted to study medicine, but Loznica could not provide him a scholarship to study abroad. A grammar-school teacher suggested that he attend geography classes at the Velika skola in Belgrade (now the University of Belgrade). Cvijić took his advice, enrolling in the natural sciences department and graduating in 1889.

Cvijić taught at the Second Male Grammar School in Belgrade and in the meantime published his first geographical work on the Karst landscape in 1889 after a trip to the eastern countryside of Serbia piqued his interest.

He enrolled at Vienna University where he studied physical geography and geology under the tutelages of scholars like Albrecht Penck, Professor Suess (president of the Austrian Academy) and Julius von Hann. He received his PhD from Vienna University in 1893. His thesis Das Karstphänomen, introduced the sub-discipline study of Karst geomorphology.

Soon afterwards, Cvijić would tour the Balkans to conduct fieldwork and research.

In 1911, Cvijić married Ljubica Nikolić, a widow from Belgrade, née Krstić (1879–1941).

Research 

Cvijić's work can be compartmentalized into five sections: the karst, glaciations in the Balkan mountains, tectonic elements in the peninsula, lakes and human geography. Much of his research was complicated by the tense political situations with the Austro-Hungarian and Ottoman authorities, dangerous and remote areas and lack of suitable roads and maps.

In the mid 1890s, Cvijić's excursions took him first to eastern Serbia and then to Bulgaria, where he visited the area around the Rila mountain range. Later, he focused on the mountains of Bosnia and Herzegovina and Montenegro, studying the karst and tectonic structure, looking for evidence of glaciations, leading him to publish Papers on the glacial epoch in the Balkan peninsula.

He was interested in geology and geomorphology. Cvijić's monograph on lime karst was well received in European scientific circles, and an introductory academic lecture established him as the first South Slavic tectonicist. The Serbian lime fields had been studied only peripherally by Otto von Pirch (1830), Ami Boué (1840), Felix Philipp Kanitz, Milan Milićević, Jovan Žujović and Vladimir Karić before him.

Cvijić conducted a pioneering human-geographical survey in "Balkan Peninsula 1918", 1922–I, 1931–II, based on his research of Balkan personality types.  He researched for 38 years, leading expeditions in the Balkans, the southern Carpathian Mountains and Anatolia which produced a number of research papers. Cvijić's two-volume Geomorphology is an important starting point for research into the Balkan peninsula.

Karst geomorphology 
When studying under Albrecht Penck's tutelage he was encouraged to focus on the study of karst phenomena in the northern Dinaric Alps which was a region Penck was already acknowledged with. His first major work was Das Karstphänomen published in 1893. This work was a publication of the key points of his doctoral thesis. Das Karstphänomen was published as a slightly modified translation in Serbo-Croat in 1895. This work describes landforms such as karren, dolines and poljes. In a 1918 publication, Cvijić proposed a cyclical model for karstic landscape development. The results of this work written in French were made accessible to English-language scientists in 1921 when it was commented by E.M. Sanders. Differences in climate and geology were used by Cvijić to explain various shapes and types of karst landforms, sometimes incorrectly. Nevertheless, his views on the role of climate on the development of karst were more accurate than those of various climatic geomorphologists that succeeded him and who greatly exaggerated the role of climate.

It has been attributed to Cvijić that the term karst prevailed over Edouard Martel's proposed term "Le Causse". Another terminology usage indebted to Cvijić is that of doline, a term he introduced, and that overlaps with that of sinkhole.  Eventually, Cvijić emerged as the "father of karst geomorphology".

Human geography 

Concurrently, he developed an interest in the life of people living in the Balkans. His travels took him to Macedonia and its lakes, the coastlines of Albania and Greece, to Lake Skadar and Lake Pamvotida. In 1902 he published his first work on human geography. In 1906 he published his signature monograph Basics of Geography and Geology of Macedonia and Old Serbia, which would become a staple reference for future researchers.

In 1896 Cvijić published "Instructions for studying villages in Serbia and other Serbian lands", which was later revised to apply to other Balkan regions.

Cvijić's thesis on the effects of climate and geography on human life is the basis of his approach to human geography, where he emphasizes that humankind is ecologically sensitive. When classifying anthropological types Cvijić considered social structure (work, endogamy, exogamy and migration) the primary factor, stressing the effects of the physical environment on a population's psyche. His basic concepts are presented in the 1902 Balkan-peninsula paper, "Human-geography problems". Influenced by Cvijić's paper, Milorad Dragić (a former student) elaborated on psychological anthropological research in his 1911 paper "Instructions for studying settlements and psychological characteristics" (after which Cvijić expanded his thesis on "The Balkan peninsula and South Slavic lands" in Serbian).

Cvijić introduced the term 'metanastasic movements', which referred to slow, gradual, a place-to-place human movement. He and his students took wide exploration of this phenomenon, eventually establishing the Serbian ethnological-historic school which gathered ethnological material from all around the Balkan peninsula and encompassed exploration of written sources.

The sparking of interest in human-geographical and ethnographical research was one of the greatest achievements of Cvijić's scientific career. His efforts and research helped him gather crucial data, which he used during negotiations on the state borders of the Kingdom of Yugoslavia after World War I.

Influence on Yugoslav state borders 
After the conclusion of World War I, Cvijić was invited to the Paris Peace Conference as an expert on border delineation. Using ethnographic charts, Cvijić demonstrated the geographical distribution of the various Balkan peoples which helped determine the borders of a new country: the Kingdom of Serbs, Croats and Slovenes. It was agreed that the new country should incorporate Banat, Bačka, Baranya and Carniola as well as the Bled triangle (Bled, Bohinj and Triglav).

Teaching 
After Cvijić's return from Vienna in March 1893 he became a professor in the Faculty of Philosophy of the Velika Skola in Belgrade where he taught geography. He was tenured and taught there until 1927.

Cvijić played an active role in reforming the school, helping found an ethnography department whose first professor was his oldest student and assistant, Jovan Erdeljanović (followed by Tihomir Đorđević); Cvijić remained in the geography department. He was influential in establishing five new faculties: medicine, agriculture and theology in Belgrade, philosophy in Skopje and the Subotica Law School. From 1906 to 1907 he was rector of Belgrade University and again from 1919.

In 1915 he lectured about the Balkans at Sorbonne University in Paris.

Views

Critique of education 
Cvijić thought that the grammar-school education of that era should last seven years, instead of eight, and felt that young men should be included early in adult life and independent work.

He published detailed instructions for conducting field research into populations and habitats to help his colleagues, including the 1907 article "On scientific research and our University".

Territorial expansion 
Cvijić' s scientific impartiality has been criticized for his support of Serbia's political advancement; his geographic work was used to scientifically justify politics of territorial expansion and further territorial claims.

According to Cvijić, Bulgarians were "different from the other South Slavs in their ethnic composition". He described as Slav three ethnographic groups previously considered Bulgarians: the Macedonian Slavs, the Shopi and the Torlaks. Cvijić excluded the region around Sofia (Bulgaria's capital) from the Bulgarian group, maintaining that the aforementioned groups were Slavic (and therefore Serbian). He believed that Serbia could govern a much larger area than the territory it held.

Legacy 

With a group of geographers and biologists, Cvijić founded the Serbian Geographic Society in Belgrade in 1910 and was its president until his death. In 1912 he began a magazine, the Serbian Geographic Society Herald, which is still published. Cvijić conducted weekly seminars for science students, which were also attended by teachers from Belgrade grammar schools. He founded the Faculty of Philosophy's Geographical Institute in 1923 (the first such organization in the Balkans), managing it until his death.

In 1947, the Serbian Academy of Sciences and Arts founded the Jovan Cvijić Geographical Institute in Belgrade. On 21–22 November 2002, the Academy hosted a meeting on "the socio-political work of Jovan Cvijić".

The Jovan Cvijić's house is housed in his family's house in Belgrade at 5 Jelena Ćetković Street. Since 1996, the house (built in 1905) has been declared a cultural monument by the state and was decorated by Dragutin Inkiostri Medenjak; Cvijić favored a decorative style based on Balkan folklore. The museum features manuscripts, letters, notes, books, paintings, geographical charts, atlases and personal items, and occasional lectures are presented.

In Serbia, a number of schools and streets are named after Cvijić and he is still considered the most important Serbian geographer. His work has been continued by his students, six of whom later became members of the Serbian Academy (including Pavle Vujević, Borivoje Z. Milojević and Milisav Lutovac). The scientist's life and work were researched by geographer Milorad Vasović for his 454-page book, Jovan Cvijić: Scientist, Public Worker, Statesman (1994).

Academic honors 

Cvijić received a number of awards. He belonged to 30 scientific societies (academies, geographical and natural societies), receiving ten decorations. Cvijić received a gold medal for his work in 1924 from the New York Geographical Society and medals from England and France. Two varieties of saffron were named after him.

Cvijić was awarded:
1917: Medal of Geographical society of Paris
1918: Medal of the Charles University in Prague
1920: Patron's Medal of the Royal Geographical Society
1924: Cullum Geographical Medal
1924: Medal of the Paris-Sorbonne University
1924: Gold medal of the American geographical society, New York

Cvijić was named:
Honorary doctor, University of Paris
Honorary doctor, Charles University in Prague
Member of the Serbian Royal Academy
Member of the Czech Academy
Member of the Academy in Brussels
Corresponding Member of the Yugoslav Academy of Sciences and Arts, Zagreb
Corresponding Member of the Royal Academy of Italy
Corresponding Member of the Parmasus Science Association, Athens
Corresponding Member of the Russian Geographical Society, Saint Petersburg
Corresponding Member of geographical societies in Budapest, Vienna, Geneva, Warsaw, Bucharest, Munich, Berlin, Amsterdam and London
Honorary president of the Congress of Geographers and Ethnologists, Prague (1922)
President of the Serbian Royal Academy from 12 April 1921 until his death in 1927
Rector of the University of Belgrade (twice)

Works 

In more than 30 years of scientific study, Cvijić published many works. One of the best-known is The Balkan Peninsula. 
Other publications include:
Ka poznavanju krša istočne Srbije, 1889.
Prekonoška pećina, 1891.
Geografska ispitivanja u oblasti Kučaja,  1893.
Das Karstphänomen, Geographiche Abhandlungen, Wien, 1893.
Karst, geografska monografija, Belgrade 1895.
Pećine i podzemna hidrografija u istočnoj Srbiji, 1895.
Izvori, tresave i vodopadi u istočnoj Srbiji, 1896.
Tragovi starih glečera na Rili, 1897.
Glacijalne i morfološke studije o planinama Bosne, Hercegovine i Crne Gore, 1899.
Karsna polja zapadne Bosne i Hercegovine, 1900.
Struktura i podela planina Balkanskog poluostrva, 1902.
Antropogeografski problemi Balkanskog poluostrva, 1902.
Novi rezultati o glacijalnoj eposi Balkanskog poluostrva, 1903.
Balkanska, alpijska i karpatska glacijacija, 1903.

Nekolika posmatranja o etnografiji makedonskih Slovena, 1906.
Osnove za geografiju i geologiju Makedonije i Stare Srbije, 1, 1906; 2, 1906; 3, 1911.
Grundlinien der Geographie und Geologie von Mazedonien und Alt-Serbien. Nebst Beobachtungen in Thrazien, Thessalien, Epirus und *Nordalbanien, 1908.
Jezerska plastika Šumadije, 1909.
L'anexion de la Bosnie et la question Serbe, Paris, 1909.
Dinarski Srbi, 1912.
Izlazak Srbije na Jadransko More, 1912.
Raspored Balkanskih naroda, 1913.
Ledeno doba u Prokletijama i okolnim planinama, 1913.
Jedinstvo i psihički tipovi dinarskih južnih Slavena, 1914.
Mouvements metanastasiques dans la Peninsule Balkanique, La Monde Slave, 1917.
Hydrographie souterraine et évolution morphologique du Karst, 1918.
La Peninsule Balkanique, Geographie Humaine, 1918.
Etnogeografske karte jugoslovenskih zemalja, 1918.
Severna granica južnih Slavena (La frontiere septentrionale des Jugoslaves), 1919.
Đerdapske terase, 1922.
Balkansko poluostrvo i južnoslovenske zemlje, 1922.
Metanastazička kretanja, njihov uzrok i posledice, 1922.
Geomorfologija I-II, 1924. and 1926.
Karst i čovek, 1925.
Karst i srpske narodne pripovetke, 1925.
Seobe i etnički procesi u našem narodu, 1927. 
Balkansko poluostrvo i južnoslavenske zemlje, 1931.

See also
 Jovan Hadži-Vasiljević
 Vladan Đorđević
 Zarija Popović
 Ami Boué
 Alexander Hilferding

References

Notes

Sources

External links 

Jovan Cvijić – Biography (in Serbian)
Biography on Serbian Academy of Sciences and Arts site
Балканско полуострво и Јужнословенске земље (1. део) 
Балканско полуострво и Јужнословенске земље (2. део) 
О исељавању босанских мухамеданаца 
Анексија Босне и Херцеговине и српско питање 
Праве и лажне патриоте 

1865 births
1927 deaths
Belgrade Higher School alumni
Academic staff of Belgrade Higher School
Burials at Belgrade New Cemetery
Human geographers
Members of the Serbian Academy of Sciences and Arts
People from Loznica
People from the Principality of Serbia
Recipients of the Cullum Geographical Medal
Serbian nationalists
Academic staff of the University of Belgrade
Rectors of the University of Belgrade
University of Vienna alumni
Geomorphologists
Serbian geographers
Serbian ethnographers
Tectonicists